

Richard Reimann (2 November 1892 – 28 October 1970) was a General der Flakartillerie in the Luftwaffe during World War II. He was a recipient of the Knight's Cross of the Iron Cross, awarded by Nazi Germany to recognise successful military leadership.

Reimann surrendered to the American forces on 8 May 1945 and was later handed over to Soviet forces. Convicted as a war criminal in the Soviet Union, he was held until 1955.

Awards and decorations

 German Cross in Gold (1 August 1942)
 Knight's Cross of the Iron Cross on 3 April 1943 as Generalmajor and commander of 18. Flak-Division

References

Citations

Bibliography

 
 
 

1892 births
1970 deaths
People from Minden
German Army personnel of World War I
Luftwaffe World War II generals
Recipients of the clasp to the Iron Cross, 1st class
Recipients of the Gold German Cross
Recipients of the Knight's Cross of the Iron Cross
German prisoners of war in World War II held by the United States
German prisoners of war in World War II held by the Soviet Union
People from the Province of Westphalia
Reichswehr personnel
Prussian Army personnel
Generals of Anti-aircraft Artillery
20th-century Freikorps personnel
Military personnel from North Rhine-Westphalia